KTAE (1260 kHz) is a commercial AM radio station licensed to Elgin, Texas, and serving the Austin metropolitan area.  It is owned by Genuine Austin Radio with studios and offices along Loop 360 in Southwest Austin.  KTAE mostly simulcasts the sports radio format of sister station 104.9 KTXX-FM.  

KTAE is powered at 1,000 watts by day and 144 watts at night.  The transmitter is on North Main Street in Taylor, Texas.  Programming is also heard on 250-watt FM translator K270CO at 101.9 MHz in Round Rock, Texas.

Programming
KTAE and KTXX-FM call themselves "The Horn," referring to the Texas Longhorns.  They are the flagship stations for the University of Texas at Austin sports teams.  KTAE and KTXX-FM air local sports shows during the day and carry programming from Houston-based SportsMap on nights and weekends.

History
KTAE, under the KWNX call sign, was a talk radio station, then became an ESPN Deportes Radio affiliate, and was the first Spanish-language sports radio station in Texas. On September 4, 2011, KWNX became a straight simulcast of its sister station, KTXX-FM, with the exception of broadcasts of Texas Rangers baseball, occasional Round Rock Express baseball, and Baylor Bears and Texas State Bobcats football. On August 19, 2013, it stopped simulcasting with KTXX-FM and began broadcasting ESPN Radio programming throughout the day. The lone exception during the weekday was Afternoons with Bucky and Erin, which was also broadcast on KTXX-FM. KWNX continued to broadcast Texas Rangers games, Texas State football games and occasional Round Rock Express and San Antonio Spurs games.

On January 2, 2014, after its sister station, KTXX-FM, became a mix of local sports talk and classic hits, KWNX again became a straight simulcast of KTXX-FM. The exceptions were when KWNX aired Texas Rangers games, San Antonio Spurs games, Texas State football games, occasional Round Rock Express games and various other sporting events.

The call sign changed to KLGO on May 19, 2014.

On June 5, 2014, the simulcast of KTXX-FM ceased and it became a gospel music station. It continued to broadcast sporting events, including Texas Rangers games, San Antonio Spurs games, Texas State football games, occasional Round Rock Express games and various others.

On May 10, 2015, KLGO changed their format to comedy, branded as "Comedy 1260". It also continued to broadcast sporting events, including Texas Rangers games, San Antonio Spurs games, Texas State football games, occasional Round Rock Express games and various others.

On August 29, 2015, KLGO again became a simulcast of KTXX-FM. The exceptions are Texas Rangers games, some Texas Longhorns sports, occasional Round Rock Express games, and various others.

The station changed its call sign back to the original KTAE on June 15, 2017.

References

External links

Hornfm.com 

TAE (AM)
Radio stations established in 1948
1948 establishments in Texas